Life and Death Are Wearing Me Out is a 2006 novel by Chinese writer Mo Yan, who won the Nobel Prize for Literature in 2012.  The book is a historical fiction exploring China's development during the latter half of the 20th century through the eyes of a noble and generous landowner who is killed and reincarnated as various farm animals in rural China. It has drawn praise from critics, and was the recipient of the inaugural Newman Prize for Chinese Literature in 2009. An English translation was published in 2008.

This landlord is the protagonist of this book, Ximen Nao. After he was killed, he went through a total of six reincarnations. He turns into a donkey, a cow, a pig, a dog, a monkey in turn, and finally in 2000 he is reborn as a baby with a very large head. In this novel, the big-headed baby, who is one of the narrators of the story, tells his grandfather, Lan Jiefang, how he felt when he was reincarnated as an animal in each life. The story of the landlord Ximen Haou's family and the peasant Lan Lian's family is a sad story of life and death fatigue for about fifty years. The novel talks about the story of China from 1950 to 2000 by telling the story of Ximen Tun, which develops around Ximen Nao. Through the eyes of a donkey, a cow, a pig, a dog, a monkey, and a big-headed baby, Lan Qiansui, the novel looks at and savors the history of Chinese rural society for more than fifty years. What Mo Yan writes is not only the story of rural China, but also the development process of Chinese society, and the real lives of those at the people.

The inspiration for "Life and Death Are Wearing Me Out" came from the author Mo Yan's real life. One of the protagonists of the novel, Lan Lian, is based on a single worker in Mo Yan's hometown. This single worker was the only person in the village who was different from the others at that time. At that time, China was in the midst of a people's commune movement. The whole country was calling on every family to work together. So, the only single worker became a different person in the eyes of everyone. Every day he pushed a wooden wheelbarrow and drove a donkey past the students with his wife, who was wrapped in a small foot. This man, who was different from the times, left a deep impression on Mo Yan. And the blue face in the book "Fatigue of Life and Death" is also a single-occupant household that is firm in his beliefs. He did not listen to anyone's advice, and through all the difficulties, he kept on living as a single worker. His wife, his adopted son, and daughter, and his son all left him to work in the commune. But he didn't change his mind about any of them. From his experience,  can also see the development of Chinese society and the change in people's hearts

Plot
The story's protagonist is Ximen Nao, a benevolent and noble landowner in Gaomi County, Shandong province. Although known for his kindness to peasants, Nao is targeted during Mao Zedong's land reform movement in 1948 and executed so that his land could be redistributed. When the landlord Ximen Nao is accused of being a class enemy and is eventually shot by Huang Tong, an active executor of Mao Zedong’s policies.

Upon his death, Nao finds himself in the underworld, where Lord Yama tortures him in an attempt to elicit an admission of guilt. Nao retains that he is innocent, and as punishment. While he was alive, he did not exploit the people as other landlords did. He was a very labor-loving and kind landlord. He adopted the orphan Lan Lian, who is also one of the main characters of the novel. In his several reincarnations, Ximen Nao also has many stories about Lan Lian's family. Ximen Nao did not understand why he was killed. So after his death, he was with hatred.While Yama believes in his innocence, he is nevertheless dissatisfied with Ximen Nao’s grudge against his enemies and the mortal world. Therefore, Lord Yama sends him back to earth where he is reborn as a donkey in his village on January 1, 1950.  In subsequent reincarnations, he goes through life as a donkey, an ox, a pig, a dog, and a monkey, until finally being born again as a man. In the six reincarnations of Ximen Nao, it is the process of gradually forgetting his hatred. Donkey, cow, pig, dog, monkey and human. In the order of his reincarnation is also getting closer and closer to people. He went from wanting revenge at the beginning to thinking in animal terms at the end. This is the process of him fading away from his hatred. After getting rid of all feelings of hatred, Ximen Nao is eventually allowed to be reborn as a human once again. After all these reincarnations, however, the reader discovers that his family name is no longer Ximen, but Lan. Through the lens of various animals, the protagonist experiences the political movements that swept China under Communist Party rule, including the Great Chinese Famine and Cultural Revolution, all the way through to New Year's Eve in 2000. The author, Mo Yan, uses self-reference and by the end of the novel introduces himself as one of the main characters.In the novel, Mo Yan is more like a character who complements the narrator's perspective. There are two main narrators in the novel, one is the big-headed baby Lan Qiansui, who is reborn from Ximen Nao haunting. The other is Lan Qiansui's grandfather, Lan Jiefang. The author uses interpolation in the novel to allow the two narrators to narrate the story in cross-order in the novel. They describe the world as they see it and their perceptions of what is happening as they tell the story. Mo Yan, on the other hand, goes to add a third-party perspective to describe the story. He is a character who is not related to Simon's haunted family by blood. But he is connected to all the characters that appear in the story. He is always present around the protagonists. Mo Yan is an apparently unimportant, but indispensable character. Many fragments of fiction written by Mo Yan appear in the novel. In these fragments are Mo Yan's views and records of what happens in Ximentuan. He is more like a spectator of history. In his perspective, the reader can read a different perspective of the story. 

Mo Yan criticizes social and political movements for their oppression and persecution of human life. His narratives describe animality to break down the anthropocentric barriers between human and animals. “The multi-dimensional representation of human animality has been the distinctive feature of Mo Yan’s literary practice of exploring humanity.” The animal allegory in this novel is based on a literary imagination of Buddhist samsara: a complete cycle starting from a human’s rebirth as an animal and ending with an animal’s rebirth as a human. This process not only expresses human’s existential wish to forget hatred, but also constructs an ecological holism of the harmony among humans, animals, and nature. In this way, ecological criticism intersects with political and cultural criticism.

Reviews
Life and Death Are Wearing Me Out garnered highly favorable reviews, though some critics suggested the narrative style was at times difficult to follow. Jonathan Spence described it as "a wildly visionary and creative novel, constantly mocking and rearranging itself and jolting the reader with its own internal commentary. This is politics as pathology...a vast, cruel and complex story."  Steven Moore of the Washington Post writes it is "a grimly entertaining overview of recent Chinese history...Mo Yan offers insights into communist ideology and predatory capitalism that we ignore at our peril. This 'lumbering animal of a story,' as he calls it, combines the appeal of a family saga set against tumultuous events with the technical bravura of innovative fiction."

The book's translator, Howard Goldblatt, nominated it for the 2009 Newman Prize for Chinese Literature, writing "it puts a human (and frequently bestial) face on the revolution, and is replete with the dark humor, metafictional insertions, and fantasies that Mo
Yan’s readers have come to expect and enjoy." Kirkus Book Reviews called the novel "epic black comedy...This long story never slackens; the author deploys parallel and recollected narratives expertly, and makes broadly comic use of himself as a meddlesome, career-oriented hack whose versions of important events are, we are assured, not to be trusted. Mo Yan is a mordant Rabelaisian satirist, and there are echoes of Laurence Sterne's Tristram Shandy in this novel's rollicking plenitude."

For as Derrida notes, a specter is an oxymoron in nature: “it is both visible and invisible, both phenomenal and non-phenomenal; a trace that marks the present with its absence in advance.” (39) This ability of the specter to transgress boundaries, to be “both-and” (Both present and absent, both visible and invisible) makes it possible to serve as a catalyst that mobilizes an excavation of the repressed history, while at the same time questioning the construction of historical knowledge. However, if for Derrida and other poststructuralists, the spectral logic is “de facto a deconstructive logic” (39), a metatrope that tends to deconstruct all, I hope my analysis of Mo Yan’s and Morrison’s texts show the constructive potential of a poetic of spectrality in fiction – through evoking the repressed specter of history and instilling in the narrative an instability through the specter’s transgression, the poetic of spectrality combines the postmodernist deconstruction of history and truth and literature’s ethical function as social critique.

References
7. Akhavan, Omid, & Zohdi, Esmaeil. 2015. Mo Yan’s Life and Death Are Wearing Me Out: A Conceptual Integration Analysis.

8. Wang, Jinyue. 2019. Translating and Rewriting Chinese Proverbs: A Case Study of Howard Goldblatt’s English Translation of Mo Yan’s “Shengsi Pilao”.

9. Pirazzoli, Melinda. 2021. Redefining Anthropos and Life. A Phenomenological Reading of Ximen Nao’s Post- Human Journey Towards Enlightenment in Mo Yan’s        Life and Death are Wearing Me Out.

10. He, Chengzhou. 2018. Animal Narrative and the Dis-eventalization of Politics: An Ecological–Cultural Approach to Mo Yan’s Life and Death are Wearing Me Out.

11. Fu, Mengxing. 2018 Fantastic Time as Para-History: Spectrality and Historical Justice in Mo Yan’s Life and Death Are Wearing Me Out.

12. Yiju, Huang. 2020. A Buddhist Perspective: Trauma and Reincarnation in Mo Yan's "Life and Death Are Wearing Me Out".

2006 Chinese novels
Novels set in Shandong
Novels by Mo Yan
Postmodern novels